The Warsaw Trade Tower (WTT) is a skyscraper in Warsaw. The Warsaw Trade Tower is the fourth tallest building in Poland.

The building is on Chłodna and Towarowa streets, two blocks from the Warsaw Uprising Museum. 

The Warsaw Trade Tower has a metal spire (mast antenna relay) attached to the building on steel rims.

Construction took place from 1997 to 1999 by the Korean company Daewoo. In 2002, Daewoo sold the property to the American firm Apollo-Rida. At  in height (the main roof goes up to a height of ), the 43-storey skyscraper includes a two-storey shopping centre, offices, and three floors of underground parking for 300 cars.

See also
 List of tallest buildings in Poland

References

External links
Skyscrapers of Warsaw - Warsaw Trade Tower

Office buildings completed in 1999
Wola
Skyscraper office buildings in Warsaw
1999 establishments in Poland